Kinghorn Lifeboat Station is a RNLI station located in the town of Kinghorn in Fife, Scotland. The station is currently equipped with an Atlantic 85 inshore lifeboat bearing the name Tommy Niven. The station is open most weekends in the summer for visitors.

History 
Kinghorn Lifeboat station was established in 1965 by the RNLI to help provide more cover in the Firth of Forth as more leisure craft became deployed in the area at that time. Initially a small shed structure made from Hardun wood was built which housed a D-class lifeboat which operated in summer months only. The boat was launched by hand across Kinghorn beach. The first launch of the boat in 1965 saw the crew deliver letters to residents of Inchkeith and Inchcolm to inform them of the station being built.

In 1982 a new pre-cast boathouse was built to replace the previous wooden structure. On 10 June 1985 the station received a new twin-engine c-class lifeboat with the registration mark C514. This boat was also accompanied with a sea-going tractor to assist launching. In 1987 the station was altered in order to fit the launching trolley equipment inside the boathouse to aid fast launch times. 

In 1995 the station was upgraded significantly with a new two-storey building erected which had lifeboat crew quarters as well as an operation centre and visitor shop. At the same time a launch ramp and concrete slipway was installed. On 29 June that year an Atlantic 21 boat was brought into temporary service being replaced with an Atlantic 75 lifeboat, with registration B720, on 12 December.

Current Service 
The Atlantic 85 boat, Tommy Niven, was brought into service on 22 October 2009. The boat bears the name of a benefactor who left a bequest to the RNLI.

In 2019 a balloon in the shape of the fictional superhero character Iron Man was mistaken for a person in the water off Kirkcaldy. The Kinghorn lifeboat was scrambled and spent an hour searching for the missing person. A local Subaru car dealership later admitted to accidentally allowing the blown to blow away and made a donation to the station.

The station holds an annual sponsored Loony Dook in January and an open day during the summer to raise funds for the running of the facility.

Fleet

References 

Lifeboat stations in Scotland
1965 establishments in Scotland